The International Wool Textile Organisation (IWTO) is the international body representing the interests of the world's wool-textile trade and industry. Its members include wool growers, traders, primary processors, spinners, weavers, garment makers and retailers of wool and allied fibres, as well as organizations related to wool products.

See also
 International Wool Secretariat

References

External links
International Wool Textile Organisation

International trade associations
Wool organizations